

Neston Park is an English country house and estate in the village of Neston, some 2 miles (3 km) south of Corsham, Wiltshire. The name of the village of Neston is derived from the name of the house.

The present house dates from 1790 and has been extended several times since then. It is ashlar-built in two storeys (three storeys at rear) with a frontage of eight bays, and is Grade II* listed.

The grounds of the house contain farmland: the estate extends from north of Neston village, southwards beyond Atworth, to South Wraxall, and includes the certified organic home farm with a herd of Jersey cattle and unusual Aberdeen Angus and Jersey cross-bred cattle. The route of the ancient Roman road from London to Bath crosses the home farm from east to west, about 200 metres (700 feet) south of the house.
The local portion of the road is sometimes known as the Wansdyke.

History

The Neston estate was built up by Thomas Tropenell in the 15th century, passed to the Eyre family and then by marriage to the Baronets Hanham. They sold it c.1790 to John Fuller (died 1839), who built Neston House. John was succeeded in turn by John Bird Fuller (died 1872), George Pargiter Fuller, MP (died 1927) and other descendants. The Fuller family became known for their participation in the Fuller, Smith and Turner brewery in London, producer of Fuller's London Pride cask ale.

In 1910, the then Neston Park proprietor John Michael Fuller, MP was created a baronet on the recommendation of the Asquith government. In 1998 James Fuller became the proprietor, estate manager and fourth Baronet.

Noted explorer of Africa, John Hanning Speke, a nephew of the Fuller family, died from a self-inflicted gunshot wound while hunting partridge at Neston Park in 1864.

In the late 1990s, the estate obtained a Countryside Stewardship Scheme agreement from the government, supporting a programme of hedge, wall and wild flower field margin restoration.
The farm shop and coffee shop were established in Atworth in 2006. In 2013 a Bath Stone mine, called Park Lane Quarry and first worked in 1880, was reopened on the estate.

The estate has been used as the filming location of a number of productions, including the outdoor sets for the 2008 BBC television adaptation of Lark Rise to Candleford, and some scenes of the ITV series Persuasion.

Unlike the neighbouring estate of Great Chalfield Manor, occupied by other members of the Fuller family, Neston Park is not open to the public, although several public paths cross the land.

See also
Hanham baronets
Fuller baronets

References

External links

 FULLER (UK) 1910, of Neston Park, Corsham, Wiltshire, Debrett's Illustrated Baronetage, page B369, from Debrett's Peerage & Baronetage at www.exacteditions.com (Subscription or library card required.)

Official websites:
www.nestonpark.co.uk — Neston Park Estate
www.nestonparkfarmshop.com — Farm Shop
nestonparkstud.co.uk — Stud

Country houses in Wiltshire
Georgian architecture in Wiltshire
Grade II* listed buildings in Wiltshire
Grade II* listed houses